Krimulda Parish is an administrative unit of Sigulda Municipality in the Vidzeme region of Latvia. Prior to the 2009 administrative reforms it was part of Riga District.

Towns, villages and settlements of Krimulda Parish

References 

Parishes of Latvia
Sigulda Municipality
Vidzeme